Billardiera longiflora, the purple apple-berry, is a small Australian vine found in cool, moist forests from southern New South Wales to Tasmania, where it is native. It was described by French botanist Jacques Labillardière in 1805. The slender leafed vine has greenish-yellow flowers and shiny purple fruit. The fruit is edible.

It is classified within the family Pittosporaceae and the genus Billardiera.

Identification 
This vine is an evergreen climber that tends to twine up around the shrubby under-story of forests with a maximum height of ten meters on tall trees. It can be recognised by its narrow, elliptical shape and dark green leaves. These tend to range in length between 2–5 centimeters. The stems are woody, brown in colour and wiry. The fleshy fruit can also clearly be identified by their shiny nature, electric purple/blue colour and apple shaped berries that hang down amid the dark green foliage. On Mount Wellington in Tasmania, some fruit have also been found to be white in colour.

The tubular shaped flowers are pale yellow, purplish or green in colour with a length of 2.5 centimeters. Each flower is solitary, has five petals that are attached by delicate hairs, five sepals, stamens and up to five fused carpels. They are pleasantly scented and generally prominent in the months of October, November, December and January.

Habitat 
Billardiera longiflora are most commonly found in wet sclerophyll forests up to 900 meters above sea level. These forests are often found in southern Tasmania. The key characteristics of their preferred habitat include being positioned in forest understories, having access to shade and moist soil. They can survive and grow in most Tasmanian habitats aside from the driest of environments.

Other identified habitats include dry Eucalyptus forests, woodlands, riparian systems and wet Eucalyptus forests.

Seed collection 
The seeds can be found within the purple/blue fleshy fruit and each one contains approximately twelve seeds. When ripe, they are dark brown or maroon in colour. In order to remove the seeds, the capsules must first be dried and then split open.

Collection time is generally during the months of December and January.

Origins 
Billardiera longiflora is native to South-Eastern Australia and grows in the understory of moist forests. This includes New South Wales, Victoria and Tasmania. The distribution of this vine is mostly widespread in Tasmania and for further information, The Atlas of Living Australia provides a map of occurrences.

Within Tasmania, it can be found in the following municipals: Break O'Day, Brighton, Burnie, Central Coast, Central Highlands, Circular Head, Derwent Valley, Devonport, Dorset, Flinders Island, Florentine Valley, Georgetown, Glamorgan-Spring Bay, Glenorchy, Hobart, Huon Valley, Kentish, King Island, Kingborough, Latrobe, Launceston, Meander Valley, Northern Midlands, Sorell, Southern Midlands, Waratah-Wynyard, West Coast, West Tamar.

Tolerance 
It is considered to be tolerant of moist, rocky and shady sites with soil that is loam and well drained. It is identified as being resistant to frost and drought.

The vines have a hardy nature and can survive temperatures down to negative seven degrees if they are well established.

Propagation and cultivation 
The vine can be propagated from seeds or cuttings. If seeds are used, they should be ripe and sown just beneath the soil in autumn or early spring. It is important to note that the seeds may not germinate instantly, as they can remain dormant until similar conditions are available to what they would naturally require.

They should be planted in a sheltered position with semi-shade and mulched in winter if extra protection from cold temperatures is required.

Edible uses 
The fruit of the B. longiflora are the purple apple shaped berries which are considered to be edible. It is recommended the seeds be removed before being eaten.

These berries do not contain pulp and are typically found to be hollow and dry. Some suggest they are suitable to use for jam, chutney or jelly.

Related plants 
Endemic to Australia, Billardiera is a genus of small vines and shrubs of which the following are more examples of:
 Billardiera cymosa commonly known as the sweet apple-berry.
 Billardiera scandens commonly known as the common apple-berry.

References 

longiflora
Flora of New South Wales
Bushfood
Plants described in 1805
Taxa named by Jacques Labillardière